Alex René Andino Benavídez (born 2 August 1982 in Olanchito, Yoro, Honduras) is a Honduran footballer who plays as a midfielder for club Atletico Limeño in the Honduran second division.

Club career
Andino has played for Honduran top tier outfits Platense, Hispano, Real España and Real Juventud.

Atlético Choloma
On 20 August 2011, Andino made his debut with the team when he came on as a substitute for Fayron Barahona in the 61st minute  against Platense in a 3-1 win, marking the first win of the club in Liga Nacional de Honduras.

International career
Andino made his debut for Honduras in a February 2003 friendly match against Argentina and has earned a total of 6 caps, scoring no goals. He has represented his country at the 2003 UNCAF Nations Cup.

His final international game was a February 2003 UNCAF Nations Cup match against Guatemala.

References

External links 

1982 births
Living people
People from Yoro Department
Association football midfielders
Honduran footballers
Honduras international footballers
Platense F.C. players
Hispano players
Real C.D. España players
C.D. Real Juventud players
Atlético Choloma players
Liga Nacional de Fútbol Profesional de Honduras players
2003 UNCAF Nations Cup players